Lyssa menoetius is a moth of the family Uraniidae. The species was first described by German entomologist Hopffer in 1856.

Distribution
The species is native to Borneo, Sangihe, Sulawesi, and the Philippines. A few specimens have been found recently in Southern Thailand. It is mostly found in forested areas at moderate elevations. The larvae feed on the leaves of Omphalea bracteata and O. sargentii.

References

External links 
 

Uraniidae
Moths of Asia
Moths described in 1856